Benjamin Nathaniel Shaw (June 18, 1893 - March 16, 1959) was a professional baseball and football player. He also played with the Canton Bulldogs of the National Football League in 1923 as an offensive guard, helping the team to the NFL championship. After that season, he joined the Gilberton Cadamounts in the Anthracite League, after Canton failed to issue him a contract for 1924.

References

External links

 

1893 births
1959 deaths
People from Ballard County, Kentucky
Pittsburgh Pirates players
Houston Buffaloes players
Macon Tigers players
Omaha Rourkes players
Canton Bulldogs players
Gilberton Cadamounts players